Angst (German for Anguish, Fear) is the debut album by German dark wave band Lacrimosa. It was released in 1991.

History
All music and lyrics for all songs were written by Tilo Wolff. The album was recorded from 1990 to 1991 at the Sodom & Gomorra studio in Binningen, Switzerland. Tilo Wolff founded his own independent label Hall of Sermon for album release. Over the first six months only 1000 copies were sold. The first two songs from the album - “Seele in Not” and “Requiem” - were originally released in 1990 on the Clamor demo MC, the first release of Tilo Wolff.

"Clamor" was released only in 100 copies and never re-released until in 2010 these demo versions were included on the Schattenspiel album which was dedicated to the twentieth anniversary of Lacrimosa.

The idea of cover was proposed by Tilo Wolff, source photo was made by Judith Grüning, Stelio Diamantopoulos made the cover artwork and later he became a constant author of Lacrimosa'''s covers.

Releases
The original edition was released as vinyl LP and consisted of six songs. CD version was released in 1993 and was reprinted many times. Russian edition was released in 2002 as a digipack consists of Angst and Einsamkeit. Mexican limited edition was also released in 2002 including second CD with four more songs: "Versiegelt glanzumströmt", "Versuchung", "Darkness" and "Copycat". Regular editions in Mexico and Argentina contained song "Diener eines Geistes (Dirus - Mix)" as a bonus track, and Korean edition included "Promised Land" track.

Track listing

Personnel
The album was recorded by Tilo Wolff (vocals, music, lyrics, producing) with participating of Judith Grüning (female vocals in Der Ketzer'') and Philippe Alioth (mastering).

References

External links
 Album lyrics at Darklyrics.com
 
 
 muzikablog.com // Lacrimosa – Angst, Review

Lacrimosa (band) albums
1991 debut albums